Dosanjh Khurd is a village in Shaheed Bhagat Singh Nagar district of Punjab State, India. The village is administrated by Sarpanch an elected representative of the village.

Demography 
As of 2011, Dosanjh Khurd has a total number of 245 houses and population of 1077 of which 534 include are males while 543 are females according to the report published by Census India in 2011. The literacy rate of Dosanjh Khurd is 80.93%, higher than the state average of 75.84%. The population of children under the age of 6 years is 107 which is 9.94% of total population of Dosanjh Khurd, and child sex ratio is approximately 1184 as compared to Punjab state average of 846.

Most of the people are from Schedule Caste which constitutes 55.25% of total population in Dosanjh Khurd. The town does not have any Schedule Tribe population so far.

As per the report published by Census India in 2011, 321 people were engaged in work activities out of the total population of Dosanjh Khurd which includes 268 males and 53 females. According to census survey report 2011, 92.83% workers describe their work as main work and 7.17% workers are involved in Marginal activity providing livelihood for less than 6 months.

Education 
Amardeep Singh Shergill Memorial college Mukandpur and Sikh National College Banga are the nearest colleges.

Transport 

See also 
List of villages in India

References

External links 
 Tourism of Punjab
 Census of Punjab
 Locality Based PINCode

Villages in Shaheed Bhagat Singh Nagar district